Edan Leshem (born March 19, 1997) is an Israeli tennis player.  In 2015, he began playing for the Israel Davis Cup team at the age of 17.

His career-high ranking in singles is World No. 249, which Leshem achieved on 18 December 2017. His career-high ranking in doubles is No. 349, achieved on 24 September 2018.

Personal info
Leshem was born in New York City, and resides in Israel.

Career

2014–15: First ITF title
In December 2014, Leshem lost in the final of the Israeli national championships in Ra'anana to Dudi Sela, 6–1, 6–2.

In November 2015, Leshem won the Israel F15 in Tel Aviv, Israel.

2016–17: ATP and top 250 debut

In June 2016 Leshem won both the Israel F9 in Kiryat Shmona, Israel, and the Israel F10 in Akko, Israel.

In April 2017, Leshem won both the Israel F3 in Tel Aviv, Israel, defeating Matias Franco Descotte in the final, and the Israel F4 in Ramat Gan, Israel, defeating Mats Moraing in the final. In May 2017 he won the Israel F6 in Akko, Israel, defeating Ben Patael in the final.

He made his debut at the 2017 Citi Open in Washington as a qualifier where he lost to Marcos Baghdatis in the first round.

2018–19
He was elected to receive a $25,000 grant through the Grand Slam Development Fund for 2018.

In June 2018, Leshem won the doubles with Daniel Cukierman in the Israel F8 in Tel Aviv, Israel, defeating Dan Added and Albano Olivetti in the finals, and the singles in the Israel F9 in Netanya, Israel, defeating Alessandro Bega in the final.

In September 2019 he won his ninth ITF title, the M25 in Ust-Kamenogorsk, Kazakhstan, defeating Konstantin Kravchuk in the final.

2022: First ATP win, Israeli No. 1 player
At the 2022 Tel Aviv Open, his home tournament, he qualified for the main draw having received a wildcard. He defeated seventh seed Lorenzo Giustino and third seed Luca Nardi. He recorded his first ATP career win defeating compatriot, wildcard Yshai Oliel. As a result, he climbed close to 70 positions up the rankings to No. 377 and became the No. 1 Israeli player in singles on 3 October 2022.

National representation

Davis Cup
He was called up to play for the Israel Davis Cup team at the age of 17 in February 2015, after the retirement of Andy Ram.  Leshem played for the team against the Romania Davis Cup team in 2015, losing in singles to world # 159 Adrian Ungur by a score of 6–4, 6–2. In doubles, he and Bar Botzer lost to Florin Mergea (world doubles # 17) and Horia Tecău (world doubles # 9), 6–3, 6–4, 6–4. In 2020 in the G1 Israel vs Turkey Round 1 he defeated Cem Ilkel, ranked # 195 in the world.

ATP Challenger and ITF Futures/World Tennis Tour finals

Singles: 20 (9–11)

Doubles: 11 (3–8)

References

External links
 
 
 
 
 Israel Tennis Centers bio

1997 births
Living people
American emigrants to Israel
Jewish American sportspeople
Jewish tennis players
Sportspeople from New York City
Israeli male tennis players
21st-century American Jews